Christopher "Chris" Douglas John Grassick (born 3 November 1990) is a retired Scottish international field hockey player who played as a midfielder for Scotland and Great Britain. 

Grassick announced his retirement from playing hockey, due to injury, on 27 September 2019.

He played club hockey in the Men's England Hockey League Premier Division for Surbiton.

He also played for Inverleith Hockey Club.

He captained the Scotland squad that competed at the 2014 Commonwealth Games in Glasgow.

References

External links
 

1990 births
Living people
Scottish male field hockey players
Sportspeople from Edinburgh
Field hockey players at the 2014 Commonwealth Games
Surbiton Hockey Club players
Men's England Hockey League players
Commonwealth Games competitors for Scotland